Aequorivita lutea  is a  Gram-negative, aerobic, rod-shaped and non-motile bacterium from the genus of Aequorivita which has been isolated from sediments of the Pearl River in China.

References

Flavobacteria
Bacteria described in 2020